"Put Your Hands Up 4 Detroit" (formatted as "Put Your Hands Up for Detroit" outside Benelux) is a song written and produced by Dutch electronic producer and DJ Fedde le Grand. It samples Matthew Dear and Disco D's "Hands Up for Detroit".

History
The song was released in the Netherlands by Flamingo Recordings first on 26 June 2006, peaking at number four in the Dutch Top 40. It was released in the rest of Europe (UK excluded) in August 2006, and enjoyed steadily increasing popularity.

In the United Kingdom, the single originally reached number one on the UK Dance Chart and fifty three on the UK Singles Chart before being released on CD, from 12-inch vinyl and digital download sales alone. It was given a full release in Britain on 23 October 2006 and leapt to number two on the chart, selling 46,000 copies. The following week, the song climbed to number one. It remained at number one for one week before being knocked out by "The Rose" by Westlife. The single went on to be the UK's 20th best selling single of the year.

In both the United Kingdom and Australia, the song was released as "Put Your Hands Up for Detroit", with "4" replaced with "for". The song was also remixed in the UK, Germany and Spain and included verses from rappers Bizarre and King Gordy.

Lyrics
After some confusion regarding the correct lyrics to the song, Fedde Le Grand confirmed on his official website the sampled lyrics are, "put your hands up for Detroit, our lovely city", as opposed to "I love this city". The same lyrics or samples are used in Matthew Dear and Disco D's 1999 release "Hands Up for Detroit".

Music video
The video is available in two versions, a regular cut and late-night one with extended footage, and is directed by Marcus Adams and produced by Lara Schachat. It is set in Detroit, Michigan, in 2027 and features a Kubrick-type of science lab where gynoid technicians create multiple androids.

For every android they create, they test its reaction to the gynoids stripping; the first android has a meltdown; the second flirts with a male doctor (a cameo of Fedde le Grand) instead of looking at the girls; the third time it works, but he discovers that he is a robot instead of human so he escapes, causing a system shutdown protocol to be activated, shutting down the gynoids. After this the runaway android is shut down by remote terminate.

The video was filmed in the vacant offices of what used to be the headquarters of the Safeway supermarket chain at Hayes, Hillingdon. The building in which the android is built was the mainframe operations room, refurbished by the supermarket before its demise, at an estimated £5M. The alphanumeric grid layout of the room, used to record cable and pipework, can be seen as the android is built. The rest of the video is shot in the building, known as Safeway 2, formerly holding IT functions.  It is now used by Rackspace hosting.

Track listings

Dutch and Belgian CD single (Spinnin'; ARS Productions)
 "Put Your Hands Up 4 Detroit" (radio edit)
 "Put Your Hands Up 4 Detroit" (extended mix)
 "Put Your Hands Up 4 Detroit" (dub mix)

German, Austrian, and Swiss CD single (Kontor)
 "Put Your Hands Up for Detroit" (radio edit) – 2:22
 "Put Your Hands Up for Detroit" (featuring King Gordy and Bizarre of D12) – 3:05
 "Put Your Hands Up for Detroit" (club mix) – 6:37
 "Put Your Hands Up for Detroit" (DJ Delicious & Till West Remix) – 6:23
 "Put Your Hands Up for Detroit" (TV Rock and Dirty South Melbourne Militia Remix) – 6:50

UK 12-inch single (Data)
A1. "Put Your Hands Up for Detroit" (club mix)
A2. "Put Your Hands Up for Detroit" (DJ Delicious & Till West Remix)
B1. "Put Your Hands Up for Detroit" (TV Rock and Dirty South Melbourne Militia Remix)
B2. "Put Your Hands Up for Detroit" (Claude Von Stroke Packard Plant Remix)
B3. "Put Your Hands Up for Detroit" (acapella)

UK CD1 (Data)
 "Put Your Hands Up for Detroit" (radio edit)
 "Put Your Hands Up for Detroit" (club mix)
 "Put Your Hands Up for Detroit" (TV Rock and Dirty South Melbourne Militia Remix)
 "Put Your Hands Up for Detroit" (DJ Delicious & Till West Remix)
 "Put Your Hands Up for Detroit" (Soul Central Loves Detroit Remix)
 "Put Your Hands Up ... ???"
 "Put Your Hands Up for Detroit" (video—daytime version)
 "Put Your Hands Up for Detroit" (video—latre night version)

UK CD2 (Data)
 "Put Your Hands Up for Detroit" (radio edit)
 "Put Your Hands Up for Detroit" (featuring King Gordy and Bizarre of D12)

Australian CD single (Hussle)
 "Put Your Hands Up for Detroit" (radio edit)
 "Put Your Hands Up for Detroit" (club mix)
 "Put Your Hands Up for Detroit" (TV Rock and Dirty South Melbourne Militia Remix)
 "Put Your Hands Up for Detroit" (DJ Delicious & Till West Remix)
 "Put Your Hands Up for Detroit" (Claude VonStroke Packard Plant Remix)

Charts

Weekly charts

Year-end charts

Certifications

Release history

In popular culture
"Put Your Hands Up 4 Detroit" was covered by "Fredde på Grand" as "Håll upp händerna för Stureplan", an "anthem" for Sweden's hottest party sites.
The song was featured on Series 2 Episode 3 of the British television drama series Hotel Babylon. The episode was broadcast on BBC One in the United Kingdom in March 2007.
Madonna used a sample of the track in a remix version of her 2000 single "Music" as part of her Sticky & Sweet Tour.
The Detroit Red Wings play the song prior to the start of the first period.
Beginning with the 2010 season, the Detroit Tigers play the song at Comerica Park after they win at home.
The St. Louis Cardinals play a remixed version (changing the song's lyric to "Put your hands up for St Louis, our lovely city") when the team takes the field.
 behind the scenes clip at Ministry of Sound

References

2006 debut singles
2006 songs
Data Records singles
Fedde le Grand songs
Kontor Records singles
Number-one singles in Finland
Number-one singles in Scotland
Songs about Detroit
Spinnin' Records singles
UK Singles Chart number-one singles